Maradi I is an urban commune in Niger. It is a commune of the city of Maradi.

References

Communes of Niger
Maradi, Niger